The Narrow Vein Mudstone Formation (commonly known as the Narrow Vein) is an Ordovician lithostratigraphic group (a sequence of rock strata) in Mid Wales. The rock of the formation is silty, homogeneous or finely-laminated mudstone. It generally a medium blue colour. This formation has been commercially quarried as slate in several locations along its length.

Outcrops
The formation is exposed in a number of locations in Mid Wales where glacial valleys cut across it. It is especially visible in the quarries along its length

Commercial quarrying 
The Narrow Vein is one of the two major slate veins in Mid Wales that were commercially quarried. Narrow Vein rock is generally more splittable than Broad Vein rock and was often used to make roofing slates.

The Narrow Vein was quarried in the following locations:
 Bryn Eglwys where the Broad Vein was also worked, connected to the Talyllyn Railway
 Gaewern and Braichgoch quarries in Corris Uchaf, connected to the Upper Corris Tramway
 Aberllefenni Quarry which worked from the 14th. century until 2002. Also worked the Broad Vein. Connected to the Corris Railway
 Cymerau Quarry, connected to the Ratgoed Tramway
 Ratgoed quarry, which mainly worked the Narrow Vein, connected to the Ratgoed Tramway
 Hendre Ddu quarry a smaller operation connected to the Hendre-Ddu Tramway
 Gartheiniog quarry, also connected to the Hendre-Ddu Tramway
 Minllyn quarry connected to the Mawddwy Railway

References

Ordovician System of Europe
Upper Ordovician Series
Rock formations of Wales
Slate industry in Wales